Ghe or GHE may refer to:

Language
 Ge (Cyrillic), a letter of the Cyrillic script
 Ghe with upturn, a letter of the Cyrillic script, called Ghe in Ukrainian
 Southern Ghale language, spoken in Nepal

Other uses
 Garachiné Airport, in Panama
 Gernrode-Harzgerode Railway Company, a defunct German railway company
 Glass house effect, a psychological reaction to being observed extensively
 Greenhouse effect, a process contributing to global warming
 Ground heat exchanger, an element in a ground source heat pump
 GitHub, GitHub Enterprise